Ozola liwana is a geometer moth in the subfamily Desmobathrinae first described by Manfred Sommerer in 1995.

Characteristics
Externally this species is very similar to Ozola falcipennis (Moore, 1888).

Distribution and habitat
It is found in Sumatra and Borneo. The species occurs mainly in the upper montane zone.

References

External links

Desmobathrinae
Moths of Borneo
Moths described in 1995